Sini is a census town in the Seraikela CD block in the Seraikela Sadar subdivision of the Seraikella- Kharshwan district in the Indian state of Jharkhand.

Geography

Location
It has an average elevation of 183 metres (600 feet). The main source of livelihood for the common people is the Railway Workshop situated near the Sini Railway Station. There is also one Zonal Railway Training Institute (Z.R.T.I.) of Indian Railways situated at Sini. Sini is also blessed to have a very old cricket ground, popular as "Shershah Ground" (South Eastern Railway Sports Association or S.E.R.S.A.) where many inter division level competitions are held on a regular basis.

Area overview 
The area shown in the map has been described as “part of the southern fringe of the Chotanagpur plateau and is a hilly upland tract”. 75.7% of the population lives in the rural areas and 24.3% lives in the urban areas. 

Note: The map alongside presents some of the notable locations in the district. All places marked in the map are linked in the larger full screen map.

Demographics
According to the 2011 Census of India, Sini had a total population of 6,382, of which 3,340 (52%) were males and 3,042 (48%) were females. Population in the age range 0-6 years was 724. The total number of literate persons in Sini was 4,782 (84.52% of the population over 6 years). 

(*For language details see Seraikela block#Language and religion)

 India census, Sini had a population of 6,489. Males constitute 53% of the population and females 47%. Sini has an average literacy rate of 72%, higher than the national average of 59.5%: male literacy is 80%, and female literacy is 63%. In Sini, 12% of the population is under 6 years of age.

Infrastructure 
Among the civic amenities, it had  of roads with both closed and open drains. The protected water supply involved tap water from treated sources, uncovered well, overhead tank. It had 1,292 domestic electric connections, 8 road lighting points. Among the medical facilities, it had 1 hospital, 2 dispensaries, 2 health centres, 1 family welfare centre, 5 maternity and child welfare centres, 6 maternity homes, 7 nursing homes, 10 veterinary hospitals, 2 medicine shops. Among social, cultural and recreational facilities, it had 1 auditorium/ community hall. An important commodity it produced was white stone. It had the branch offices of 1 nationalised bank, 1 co-operative banks.

Transport
Sini is a station on the Tatanagar–Bilaspur section of Howrah-Nagpur-Mumbai line.

Education 
Versini High School is a Hindi-medium coeducational institution established in 1958. It has facilities for teaching from class IX to class XII. The school has a playground and a library with 1,855 books.  

South Eastern Railway Inter College is a Hindi-medium coeducational institution. It has facilities for teaching in classes XI and XII. It has a playground, a library with 15,000 books, and has 5 computers for teaching and learning purposes.

Culture
Noted filmmaker and writer Satyajit Ray has mentioned this place in his short story "Ratan Babu ar sei lokta".

References

Cities and towns in Seraikela Kharsawan district